Te Rahu  is a rural locality in the Waipa District and Waikato region of New Zealand's North Island.

Lake Ngaroto is northwest of the locality.

History
The Battle of Hingakākā was fought west of Te Rahu in the late 18th or early 19th centuries.

Te Rahu was established after the Invasion of the Waikato of 1863–64, and described as a thriving village in 1867.

A school was operating by 1878 and continued until at least 1939 but was gone by 1943.

Te Rahu Hall was built around 1905, and replaced or renovated in 1927.

Demographics
Te Rahu settlement is in two SA1 statistical areas which cover . The SA1 areas are part of the larger Te Rahu statistical area.

The SA1 areas had a population of 345 at the 2018 New Zealand census, an increase of 45 people (15.0%) since the 2013 census, and an increase of 6 people (1.8%) since the 2006 census. There were 120 households, comprising 174 males and 177 females, giving a sex ratio of 0.98 males per female, with 69 people (20.0%) aged under 15 years, 60 (17.4%) aged 15 to 29, 168 (48.7%) aged 30 to 64, and 51 (14.8%) aged 65 or older.

Ethnicities were 90.4% European/Pākehā, 12.2% Māori, 0.0% Pacific peoples, 7.8% Asian, and 1.7% other ethnicities. People may identify with more than one ethnicity.

Although some people chose not to answer the census's question about religious affiliation, 49.6% had no religion, 42.6% were Christian, 0.9% were Buddhist and 4.3% had other religions.

Of those at least 15 years old, 51 (18.5%) people had a bachelor's or higher degree, and 48 (17.4%) people had no formal qualifications. 54 people (19.6%) earned over $70,000 compared to 17.2% nationally. The employment status of those at least 15 was that 156 (56.5%) people were employed full-time, 36 (13.0%) were part-time, and 6 (2.2%) were unemployed.

Te Rahu statistical area

Te Rahu had a population of 1,167 at the 2018 New Zealand census, an increase of 189 people (19.3%) since the 2013 census, and an increase of 261 people (28.8%) since the 2006 census. There were 411 households, comprising 609 males and 558 females, giving a sex ratio of 1.09 males per female. The median age was 39.8 years (compared with 37.4 years nationally), with 240 people (20.6%) aged under 15 years, 195 (16.7%) aged 15 to 29, 561 (48.1%) aged 30 to 64, and 171 (14.7%) aged 65 or older.

Ethnicities were 91.0% European/Pākehā, 11.1% Māori, 0.5% Pacific peoples, 5.7% Asian, and 1.8% other ethnicities. People may identify with more than one ethnicity.

The percentage of people born overseas was 14.9, compared with 27.1% nationally.

Although some people chose not to answer the census's question about religious affiliation, 50.9% had no religion, 39.1% were Christian, 0.3% had Māori religious beliefs, 0.3% were Hindu, 0.5% were Buddhist and 2.8% had other religions.

Of those at least 15 years old, 180 (19.4%) people had a bachelor's or higher degree, and 177 (19.1%) people had no formal qualifications. The median income was $44,200, compared with $31,800 nationally. 225 people (24.3%) earned over $70,000 compared to 17.2% nationally. The employment status of those at least 15 was that 528 (57.0%) people were employed full-time, 147 (15.9%) were part-time, and 18 (1.9%) were unemployed.

References

Waipa District
Te Awamutu
Populated places in Waikato